Human endogenous retrovirus K endopeptidase (human endogenous retrovirus K10 endopeptidase, endogenous retrovirus HERV-K10 putative protease, human endogenous retrovirus K retropepsin, HERV K10 endopeptidase, HERV K10 retropepsin, HERV-K PR, HERV-K protease, HERV-K113 protease, human endogenous retrovirus K113 protease, human retrovirus K10 retropepsin) is an enzyme derived from an endogenous retrovirus. This enzyme catalyses the following chemical reaction:

 Processing at the authentic HIV-1 PR recognition site and release of the mature p17 matrix and the p24 capsid protein, as a result of the cleavage of the -SQNY-PIVQ- cleavage site.

This enzyme belongs to the peptidase family A2 (retropepsins).

References

External links 
 

EC 3.4.23